The Edmond J. Safra Synagogue is an Orthodox Sephardic synagogue located at 1801 Ocean Parkway on the corner of Avenue R & Ocean Parkway in Brooklyn.

Pending construction of another facility, the congregation, referred to as Congregation Beit Yaakob,
 is "currently, temporarily, housed in the former Ahaba ve Ahva Synagogue." The planned new synagogue building, is at "Ocean Parkway and Ave. U" and will house multiple synagogues, libraries, a men's Mikveh and over 35,000 sq ft of community space. The synagogue is one of the largest synagogue projects in the south Brooklyn.

It is led by Rabbi Eli J. Mansour and Rabbi Nathan Escava.

History

Origin of the congregation
The community originated in Aleppo, Syria.  Congregants—some of whom were born in the Middle East—found their way to Brooklyn and formed a congregation, though not under the present Edmond J. Safra Synagogue.  That name was attached to the Manhattan-based Congregation Beit Yaakob, housed in what today is called Congregation Beit Edmond.. Both were named for Sephardic banker and philanthropist Edmond Safra.

2005
The present synagogue was "established in 2005 ... in accordance with the dictates of the Written and Oral Torah, the Shulchan Aruch, Poskim, and in accordance with Sephardic Laws and Customs of Aleppo (Aram Soba), as perpetuated by Chief Rabbi Jacob S Kassin A”H and Hacham Baruch Ben Haim A”H." Worshippers include "Sephardic and Middle Eastern descent immigrants" and "2nd, 3rd, and 4th generation descendants."

Permanent Structure
Ground was broken in the Spring of 2014 on a new building on the Corner of Avenue U & Ocean Parkway.  The  building opened on Rosh Hashanah of 2022.

References

External links
Official site

Synagogues in Brooklyn
Orthodox synagogues in New York City
Sephardi synagogues
Safra family